World Autism Awareness Day is an internationally recognized day annually on April 2, encouraging Member States of the United Nations to take measures to raise awareness about autistic individuals throughout the world. It was designated by the United Nations General Assembly resolution (A/RES/62/139)., passed in council on November 1, 2007, and adopted on  December 18, 2007. It was proposed by Mozah Bint Nasser Al-Missned, the United Nations Representative from Qatar and consort to Emir Hamad Bin Khalifa Al-Thani, and supported by all member states.

This resolution was passed and adopted without a vote in the UN General Assembly, mainly as a supplement to previous UN initiatives to improve human rights.

World Autism Day is one of only seven official health-specific UN Days. 

The terms "Autism Awareness Day" and "Autism Awareness Month" are often contested by autism rights advocates, who claim that they feed into perceived ableism against autistic people. Such groups, including the Autistic Self Advocacy Network, advocate using the term "Autism Acceptance day" as an alternative for both events under the belief that it promotes overcoming anti-autism prejudice rather than simply increasing awareness of autism.

Components 

The original resolution had four main components:
 the establishment of the second day of April as World Autism Awareness Day, beginning in 2008
 invitation to Member States and other relevant organizations to the UN or the international societal system, including non-governmental organizations and the private sector, to create initiatives to raise public awareness of autism
 encourages Member States to raise awareness of autism on all levels in society
 asks the UN Secretary-General to deliver this message to member states and all other UN organizations

Themes 
As of 2012, each World Autism Awareness Day has focused on a specific theme determined by the UN.
 2012: "Launch of Official UN "Awareness Raising" Stamp"
 2013: "Celebrating the ability within the disability of autism"
 2014: "Opening Doors to Inclusive Education"
 2015: "Employment: The Autism Advantage"
 2016: "Autism and the 2030 Agenda: Inclusion and Neurodiversity"
 2017: "Toward Autonomy and Self-Determination"
2018: "Empowering Women and Girls with Autism"
 2019: "Assistive Technologies, Active Participation"
2020: "The Transition to Adulthood"
2021: "Inclusion in the Workplace"
2022: "Inclusive Quality Education for All"

Onesie Wednesday 

In 2014, WAAD coincided with Onesie Wednesday, a day created by the National Autistic Society to encourage people in England, Wales and Northern Ireland to show their support for anyone on the autistic spectrum. By wearing a onesie or pajamas, participants are saying, "it's all right to be different".

Outcomes in the United States 

In a 2015 Presidential Proclamation, President Obama highlighted some of the initiatives that the US government was taking to bring rights to those with autism and to bring awareness to the disorder. He highlighted things like The Affordable Care Act, which prohibits health insurance companies from denying coverage based on a pre-existing condition such as autism. He also pointed out the recent Autism CARES Act of 2014, which provides higher level training for those who are serving citizens on the autism spectrum.

See also 

 Awareness day
 Autism friendly
 Autism rights movement
 Autism Sunday
 Autistic Pride Day
 Societal and cultural aspects of autism
 United Nations' International Day of Persons with Disabilities

References 

April observances
Autism activism
Disability observances
Autism
United Nations days